Entre les Murs is a work of contemporary fiction by French writer François Bégaudeau. It is a semi-autobiographical account of Bégaudeau's experiences as a literature teacher in an inner city middle school in Paris.

Published in 2006, it won the Prix France Culture/Télérama. In 2008, it was adapted to film by Laurent Cantet, also called Entre les murs; this film received the Palme d'Or at the 2008 Cannes Film Festival.  The English-language version of Entre les murs was published in April 2009 by Seven Stories Press under the title The Class.

Bibliographical information
 Entre les murs , Éditions Verticales, 2006, .

References

2006 French novels
Novels set in Paris
Novels set in high schools and secondary schools

id:Entre les murs
it:Entre les murs
zh:围墙之间